Shimon Ullman (שמעון אולמן, born January 28, 1948, in Jerusalem)  is a professor of computer science at the Weizmann Institute of Science, Israel. Ullman's main research area is the study of vision processing by both humans and machines. Specifically, he focuses on object and facial recognition, and has made a number of key insights in this field, including with Christof Koch the idea of a visual
saliency map in the mammalian visual system to regulate selective spatial attention.

Education
He received his Ph.D. from MIT in 1977 advised by David Marr.

Research
He is the author of several books on the topic of vision, including High-level vision: Object recognition and visual cognition.

Ullman is the former head of the Department of Computer Science and Applied Mathematics at the Weizmann Institute.

Awards and honours
Ullman was awarded the 2008 David E. Rumelhart Prize for Theoretical Contributions to Cognitive Science. In 2014 he received the EMET prize in the field of computer science for his contributions to AI and computer vision.

In 2015 Ullman was awarded the Israel Prize in mathematics and computer science.

In 2019 he won the Azriel Rosenfeld Lifetime Achievement Award in the field of computer vision.

He is the co-founder of Orbotech and a former member of Israel's Council for Higher Education.

References 

1948 births
Living people
People from Jerusalem
Massachusetts Institute of Technology alumni
Israeli computer scientists
Academic staff of Weizmann Institute of Science
Rumelhart Prize laureates
Israel Prize in mathematics recipients
Israel Prize in computer sciences recipients
Fellows of the Cognitive Science Society